Dysart is a rural locality in the local government area (LGA) of Southern Midlands in the Central LGA region of Tasmania. The 2016 census recorded a population of 216 for the state suburb of Dysart.

History 
Dysart was gazetted as a locality in 1970. Until about 1875 the area was known as Shepton Monacute. The name Dysart was given to the Parish in 1836. It was taken from the property “Dysart Park”, which may have been named for Dysart in Scotland.

Geography
Many of the boundaries are survey lines.

Road infrastructure 
National Route 1 (Midland Highway) passes through from south-east to north-east, while route C185 (Clifton Vale Road) provides access to the interior of the locality.

References

Towns in Tasmania
Localities of Southern Midlands Council